This is a list of games published by Accolade (renamed as Infogrames North America, Inc. in 1999), an American video game developer and publisher based in San Jose, California. The company was founded as Accolade in 1984 by Alan Miller and Bob Whitehead, who had previously co-founded Activision in 1979. The company became known for numerous sports franchises, including HardBall!, Jack Nicklaus, and Test Drive.

Games

As Accolade

As Infogrames North America

References 

-
Accolade